In the mathematical field of  algebraic geometry, an elliptic curve E over a field K  has an associated quadratic twist, that is another elliptic curve which is isomorphic to E over an algebraic closure of K. In particular, an isomorphism between elliptic curves is an isogeny of degree 1, that is an invertible isogeny. Some curves have higher order twists such as cubic and quartic twists. The curve and its twists have the same j-invariant.

Applications of twists include cryptography, the solution of Diophantine equations, and when generalized to hyperelliptic curves, the study of the Sato–Tate conjecture.

Quadratic twist

First assume  is a field of characteristic different from 2.

 

 

or equivalently

 

Qualitatively speaking, the arithmetic of a curve and its quadratic twist can look very different in the field , while the complex analysis of the curves is the same; and so a family of curves related by twisting becomes a useful setting in which to study the arithmetic properties of elliptic curves.

Twists can also be defined when the base field  is of characteristic 2.

 

 

Quadratic twist over finite fields

In fact, if  is on just one of the curves, there is exactly one other  on that same curve (which can happen if the characteristic is not ).

As a consequence,  or equivalently , where  is the trace of the Frobenius endomorphism of the curve.

Quartic twist

Also in this case, twisted curves are isomorphic over the field extension given by the twist degree.

Cubic twist

The curves obtained are isomorphic to the starting curve over the field extension given by the twist degree.

Generalization
Twists can be defined for other smooth projective curves as well. Let  be a field and  be curve over that field, i.e., a projective variety of dimension 1 over  that is irreducible and geometrically connected.

Examples

 Twisted Hessian curves
 Twisted Edwards curve
 Twisted tripling-oriented Doche–Icart–Kohel curve

References

 
 

Elliptic curves
Elliptic curve cryptography